Ingegärd Margareta Töpel (13 May 1906 – 11 July 1988) was a Swedish diver. She competed in the 10 m platform event at the 1928 Summer Olympics, alongside her elder sister Hjördis.

References 

1906 births
1988 deaths
Olympic divers of Sweden
Divers at the 1928 Summer Olympics
Swedish female divers
Divers from Gothenburg
20th-century Swedish women